Killer Bunnies may refer to:

 Killer Bunnies and the Quest for the Magic Carrot, a noncollectible card game
 Killer Bunnies (dance project), a Canadian project
 Killer Bunnies (album), an album by Jack Walrath
 Killer Rabbit, a character from Monty Python and the Holy Grail, see Rabbit of Caerbannog